Thomas Whittaker (1614 at Burnley, Lancashire – executed 7 August 1646 at Lancaster) was an English Roman Catholic priest. A Catholic martyr, he was beatified in 1987.

Life

Son of Thomas Whitaker, schoolmaster, and Helen, his wife, he was educated first at his father's school. By the influence of the Towneley family he was then sent to Valladolid, where he studied for the priesthood.

After ordination (1638) he returned to England, and for five years worked in Lancashire. On one occasion he was arrested, but escaped while being conducted to Lancaster Castle.

He was again seized at Blacke Hall in Goosnargh, and committed to Lancaster Castle, 7 August 1643,  undergoing solitary confinement for six weeks. For three years he remained in prison. Before his trial he made a month's retreat in preparation for death.

He declined all attempts made to induce him to conform to Anglicanism by the offer of his life. He was executed with Edward Bamber and John Woodcock, saying to the sheriff: "Use your pleasure with me, a reprieve or even a pardon upon your conditions I utterly refuse".

References

Attribution
 The entry cites:
Richard Challoner, Memoirs of Missionary Priests (London, 741–2), following Knaresborough who had before him a contemporary account.

1614 births
1646 deaths
People from Burnley
16th-century English Roman Catholic priests
English beatified people
17th-century venerated Christians
Eighty-five martyrs of England and Wales